06/05, called May 6th in most English-speaking countries, is a Dutch 2004 film directed by Theo van Gogh, based on the novel De Zesde Mei by Tomas Ross.

The film is a fictional version of the events that led to the assassination of the Dutch politician Pim Fortuyn on 6 May 2002. The lines between reality and fiction are blurred in 06/05. It is the last film of Theo van Gogh, who was himself assassinated in 2004.

Theo van Gogh struck a deal with Dutch internet provider Tiscali over the film's finances. The movie was originally released in December 2004 on the internet, a situation that had never before been seen in the Netherlands; it could be watched via pay-on-demand. It was released in cinemas one month later, in January 2005.

Cast 
Tara Elders - Ayse Him
Thijs Römer - Jim de Booy
Johnny de Mol - NRC editor
Reinout Bussemaker - Volkert van der G
Marcel Hensema - Wester
Caro Lenssen - Marije
Jack Wouterse - Van Dam
Cahit Ölmez
Tooske Ragas-Breugem - Stewardess

Accolades
Thijs Römer, 2005 Golden Calf award for Best Actor
Official Selection, 2005 Toronto International Film Festival

References

External links
 
 

2004 films
Dutch thriller films
Films based on Dutch novels
Films based on thriller novels
Films directed by Theo van Gogh
2000s political thriller films
Films shot in the Netherlands
2000s Dutch-language films